Columbus Calvin "Duke" Pearson Jr. (August 17, 1932 – August 4, 1980) was an American jazz pianist and composer. Allmusic describes him as having a "big part in shaping the Blue Note label's hard bop direction in the 1960s as a record producer."

Early life
Pearson was born Columbus Calvin Pearson Jr. in Atlanta, Georgia, United States, to Columbus Calvin and Emily Pearson. The moniker "Duke" was given to him by his uncle, who was a great admirer of Duke Ellington. Before he was six, his mother started giving him piano lessons. He studied the instrument until he was twelve, when he took an interest in brass instruments: mellophone, baritone horn and ultimately trumpet. He was so fond of the trumpet that through high school and college he neglected the piano. He attended Clark College while also playing trumpet in groups in the Atlanta area. While in the U.S. Army, during his 1953–54 draft, he continued to play trumpet and met, among others, the pianist Wynton Kelly. Pearson himself confessed in a 1959 interview that he was "so spoiled by Kelly's good piano" that he decided to switch to piano again. Also, it seems that dental problems forced him to give up brass instruments.

Career
Pearson performed with different ensembles in Georgia and Florida, including with Tab Smith and Little Willie John, before he moved to New York City in January 1959. He had, however, been able to get at least one song, "Tribute to Brownie" (dedicated to Clifford Brown), recorded by the Cannonball Adderley Quintet on their 1957 album, Sophisticated Swing. In New York, Pearson gained the attention of the trumpeter Donald Byrd, who saw Pearson performing with the Art Farmer/Benny Golson Sextet (known as the Jazztet). Shortly afterwards, Byrd asked Pearson to join his newly formed band, the Donald Byrd–Pepper Adams Quintet. Pearson was also the accompanist for Nancy Wilson on tour in 1961. During that same year, Pearson became ill before a Byrd-Adams show, and a newcomer, Herbie Hancock, took over for him. Hancock eventually took over the position permanently.

On the 1963 Byrd album A New Perspective, Pearson arranged four tracks, including "Cristo Redentor", which became a hit. The composition, Pearson later commented, was inspired by a trip he took to Brazil while touring with Wilson. Also that year, after the death of Ike Quebec, Pearson took over his position as A&R man of Blue Note. From that year until 1970, Pearson was a frequent session musician and producer for numerous Blue Note albums while also recording his own albums as bandleader. This was odd, since Pearson also recorded with his co-led big band with Byrd for Atlantic Records, a stipulation he made sure was in his Atlantic contract. The Byrd-Pearson band consisted of musicians such as Chick Corea, Pepper Adams, Randy Brecker, and Garnett Brown; the latter three were members also of the Thad Jones-Mel Lewis band that played the same night club, The Village Vanguard, but on different nights. Between the two ensembles, the musicians performed at their own discretion.

Pearson's compositions include the now standard, frequently covered "Jeannine", composed c. 1960. An early cover of "Jeannine" appears on the Cannonball Adderley album Them Dirty Blues, recorded in February 1960; the song was also covered by Donald Byrd on the album At the Half Note Cafe, recorded in November 1960. A vocalese version with lyrics by Oscar Brown, Jr. was recorded by Eddie Jefferson on the album The Main Main, recorded in October 1974, and was covered on The Manhattan Transfer's 1984 album Bop Doo-Wopp. The Steve Lehman Trio recorded the song on their 2011 album Dialect Fluorescent.

As a small side project at Blue Note, Pearson penned the liner notes for Grant Green’s 1963 album, Idle Moments. He was the pianist for the recording. Having also composed the album’s title track, he wrote, “I wonder while listening to this recording, just what the people involved were thinking of while idling away (so to speak). The dreamlike mood that prevails gave me the idea of naming this tune Idle Moments.”

Pearson eventually retired from his position with Blue Note in 1971 after personnel changes were made; co-founder Alfred Lion retired in 1967 after the label was sold to Liberty Records the previous year, and co-founder Francis Wolff died in 1971. Pearson opted to teach at Clark College in 1971, toured with Carmen McRae and Joe Williams through 1973, and eventually re-formed his big band during that time.

He was diagnosed with multiple sclerosis in the 1970s, from which he died in 1980 at Atlanta Veterans Hospital.

Discography

As leader
1959: Profile (Blue Note)
1959: Tender Feelin's (Blue Note) - released 1960.
1961: Angel Eyes (Polydor) - released 1968. Also released as Bags Groove on Black Lion with 3 alternate takes)
1961: Dedication! (Prestige) - released 1970. Also reissued under Freddie Hubbard's name as Minor Mishap, Black Lion, 1989))
1962: Hush!  (Jazztime)
1964: Wahoo! (Blue Note)
1965: Honeybuns (Atlantic) - released 1966.
1966: Prairie Dog (Atlantic)
1966: Sweet Honey Bee (Blue Note) - released 1967.
1967: The Right Touch (Blue Note) - released 1968.
1967: Introducing Duke Pearson's Big Band (Blue Note) - released 1968.
1968: The Phantom (Blue Note)
1968: Now Hear This (Blue Note) - released 1969.
1969: How Insensitive (Blue Note)
1969: Merry Ole Soul (Blue Note)
1968-70: I Don't Care Who Knows It (Blue Note) - released 1996
1970: It Could Only Happen with You (Blue Note) - released 1974

As sideman
With Donald Byrd
Fuego (1959)
Byrd in Flight (1960)
At the Half Note Cafe (1960)
The Cat Walk (1961)
A New Perspective (1963)
Fancy Free (1970)
Kofi (1969–70)
Electric Byrd (1970)
With Johnny Coles
Little Johnny C (Blue Note, 1963, and arranger)
With Grant Green
Idle Moments (Blue Note, 1963)
With Bobby Hutcherson
The Kicker (Blue Note, 1963)
With Thad Jones/Pepper Adams Quintet 
Mean What You Say (Milestone, 1966)
With Carmen McRae
Carmen (1972)

As Arranger
Lou Donaldson - Lush Life (1967)
Donald Byrd - A New Perspective (1963), I'm Tryin' to Get Home (1964)
Grant Green - Am I Blue (1963)
Blue Mitchell - Boss Horn (1966), Heads Up! (1967)
Hank Mobley - A Slice of the Top (1966)
Lee Morgan - Standards (1967)
Stanley Turrentine - Rough 'n' Tumble (1966), The Spoiler (1966), A Bluish Bag (1967), The Return of the Prodigal Son (1967), The Look of Love (1968)

References

External links

Duke Pearson Discography at www.JazzDiscography.com
Duke Pearson Discography Project at www.jazzdisco.org

1932 births
1980 deaths
American jazz composers
American male jazz composers
American jazz pianists
American male pianists
American session musicians
Hard bop pianists
Post-bop pianists
Blue Note Records artists
Musicians from Atlanta
People with multiple sclerosis
Progressive big band musicians
Soul-jazz pianists
Jazz record producers
20th-century American composers
20th-century American pianists
20th-century American male musicians
The Jazztet members
20th-century jazz composers
Burials at South-View Cemetery